Dan Lonergan is a Melbourne-based sports commentator and writer for ABC Radio Grandstand.

After attending Xavier College, Lonergan had a cadetship with ABC Radio Sport in 1997 after stints at various stations including 3HA Hamilton, 3CS Colac, 3GL Geelong and Fox FM Melbourne.

Lonergan is known mostly for his Australian rules football commentary and developed his style during his days with 3HA calling the Western Border Football League over a period of two years, before he spent six years gaining experience as a news journalist and broadcaster in various areas of Western Victoria.

He spent a year in Perth and learned to broadcast AFL football after calling West Coast Eagles as well as Fremantle games.

While in Perth, he also broadcast state and international cricket and was part of ABC's coverage of the 2000 Sydney Olympics covering handball tournaments.

2001 saw Lonergan return to Melbourne and since his return, he covered two AFL Grand Finals, two Davis Cup tennis finals, four Australian Open tennis tournaments, One Day International cricket and 13 sports at the Athens Olympic Games.

One of the 13 sports he broadcast from Athens included the gold medal baseball playoff which saw Australia win its first ever baseball medal at an Olympic Games.

At the 2006 Commonwealth Games he covered the boxing.

Between May 2015 and August 2015, he presented the morning program "Ballarat Today" on radio station 3BA in Ballarat, Victoria.

From July 2016 until May 2017, when local programming was dropped, Lonergan hosted "The Lunch Box" between 11am and 3pm (AEST) on digital radio station EON Sports Radio.

Dan Lonergan is currently gainfully employed as a Freelance Sports Broadcaster, Journalist, Commentator, Producer and MC. He is currently the presenter, voice and face of sports social media company Gameface, which covers local footy and cricket throughout the Mornington Peninsula, West Gippsland, the South East and Outer East Suburbs of Melbourne.

References

External links
Profile at ABC Grandstand
Website 
Gameface Facebook Page

Australian rules football commentators
Radio personalities from Melbourne
Living people
Year of birth missing (living people)
People educated at Xavier College